Brent and Harrow is a constituency represented in the London Assembly.

It consists of the combined area of the London Borough of Brent and the London Borough of Harrow.  After the 2010 general election, the London Borough of Brent had two Labour MPs and one Liberal Democrat MP, and the London Borough of Harrow had two Conservative MPs and one Labour MP.  Both councils are currently (April 2012) Labour controlled.

Until the 2012 election, Brent and Harrow was the only GLA constituency to have changed hands since the Assembly's formation, with Labour losing the seat to the Conservatives at the 2004 election, but regaining it at the next election in 2008.

At the 2012 election, Navin Shah became the first incumbent to successfully defend Brent and Harrow, and greatly increased his majority. At the same time two other constituencies changed hands elsewhere in London.

Overlapping constituencies
The constituency contains the whole of the following UK Parliament constituencies:
Brent North - Barry Gardiner (Labour)
Brent Central - Dawn Butler (Labour)
Harrow East - Bob Blackman (Conservative)
Harrow West - Gareth Thomas (Labour)

Additionally, it also contains parts of the following two constituencies:
Hampstead & Kilburn - Tulip Siddiq (Labour)
Ruislip, Northwood & Pinner - David Simmonds (Conservative)

Assembly Members

Mayoral election results 
Below are the results for the candidate which received the highest share of the popular vote in the constituency at each mayoral election.

Assembly election results

References

London Assembly constituencies
Politics of the London Borough of Brent
Politics of the London Borough of Harrow
2000 establishments in England
Constituencies established in 2000